Ben Peel (born 1983/1984) is a Northern Irish actor known for his role in the television crime drama The Fall and the video game adaption of William Adams in Nioh series.

Background
Peel grew up in Belfast but now lives in London with his wife and daughter. He trained at the Royal Central School of Speech and Drama.

Filmography

References

External links
 

20th-century male actors from Northern Ireland
21st-century male actors from Northern Ireland
Living people
Male film actors from Northern Ireland
Male television actors from Northern Ireland
Male video game actors from Northern Ireland
Male voice actors from Northern Ireland
1983 births